Elizabeth A. Gloucester (1817-August 9, 1883) was one of the wealthiest black women in America at the time of her death and was a supporter of the Underground Railroad and a business owner.

She was born in 1817 in Richmond, Virginia as Elizabeth Amelia Parkhill to a freedwoman. Little is known about her father, but census records listed that she was "mulatto" which implies she might have had a white father. When her mother died when she was still young, she went to live with Rev. John Gloucester Sr. and she married his youngest son, James Gloucester in 1838.

Gloucester ran 15 boarding homes in New York and they lived in Brooklyn from 1855. Her husband founded the Siloam Presbyterian Church and she helped to pay for the building of the church. They hosted abolitionist John Brown and she contributed to his causes. She purchased the Hamilton Club and turned it into an upscale boarding house called the Remsen House. She hosted Fredrick Douglass, John Brown and many others at the house and held meetings for the Freedman's Friend Society, Ladies National Union Fair and Union Soldier Association.

Through the church, the Gloucesters showed their abolitionist support, hosting John Brown and serving as a stop on the Underground Railroad. They also had an Underground Railroad fund.

She led the efforts to raise money for the Colored Orphan's Asylum in Weeksville, Brooklyn which was founded in 1866.

Gloucester died on August 9, 1883 of pneumonia. In her obituary, The Eagle wrote "She came to be known to every one in Brooklyn, New York, the State and in fact throughout a great part of the country." She had six children: Emma, Stephen, Elizabeth, Eloise, Charles and Adelaide. She is buried in Brooklyn, New York at the Green-Wood Cemetery. At the time of her death, Gloucester's properties were worth about $300,000, today's 7 million dollars. Newspapers all reported that she was "the remarkable colored woman."

References 

American women in business
American abolitionists
1817 births
1883 deaths
19th-century American businesspeople
Burials at Green-Wood Cemetery